Baýramaly (formerly Bayram-Ali, earlier Bahrām Ali ) is a city in and the seat of Baýramaly District, Mary Province, Turkmenistan. It lies about 27 km east of the provincial capital Mary, along the main railway line from Ashgabat to Tashkent. In 2009, its population was estimated at 88,486 (up from 43,824 in the 1989 census).

Etymology
The city is named after Bayram 'Ali Khan Qajar, the most prominent ruler of the Qajar Principality of Merv. According to Atanyyazow, Bayramaly ruled Mary in the 18th century, from 1782 to 1785. However, the actual length of his reign remains disputed.

Overview
The city is located in a dry oasis formed by the Murghab River. Baýramaly is a climatic spa and visitors are often sent to the city for treatment of chronic kidney disease, acute forms of nephritis and nephrosis, hypertension, renal tuberculosis, and problems of blood circulation.  The Baýramaly Sanitorium has been in operation since 1933. In 2010 the sanitorium underwent renovation and two new buildings were added. The sanitorium specializes in ailments of the kidneys and urinary tract, diseases of the cardiovascular system, and diseases of the musculoskeletal system.

Climate
Baýramaly has a cold semi-arid climate (Köppen climate classification BSk), with cool winters and very hot summers. Rainfall is generally light and erratic, and occurs mainly in the winter and autumn months.

Economy
The economy is based around food and construction materials industries. Natural gas is also extracted in the area.

Sights
Close to Baýramaly are the ruins of ancient Merv.
 to the north is the mausoleum of Hudaýnazar Öwlüýä (early 12th century).

Notable people
 Mähri Hojaniyazova
 Nury Halmammedov
 Suleyman Nazarov Berdiyevich
 Dzhamaldin Khodzhaniyazov
Alvina Shpady

References

Populated places in Mary Region